Steinfort is a town in western Luxembourg.

Steinfort may also refer to:

 Lake Steinfort, in Mecklenburg-Vorpommern, Germany
 SC Steinfort, a football club from Luxembourg
 Testorf-Steinfort, a town in northern Germany
 Carl Steinfort (born 1977), Australian rules football player
 Casper Steinfort (1814–1899), 19th century American politician
 Fred Steinfort (born 1952), American football player

See also
 Steinfortsee